Mount Maude is the 15th highest peak in Washington state. The peak is located in the Entiat Mountains, a subrange of the North Cascades. It is in the Glacier Peak Wilderness, at the headwaters of the Entiat River. The peak was given its name by Albert H. Sylvester in honor of Frederick Stanley Maude.

The mountain from the south side consists of mostly talus with small rocky outcroppings, often compared with mountains in the Colorado Rockies. The northeast side is much different, with a steep rocky summit sheltering the small Entiat Glacier. Most climbers will climb Maude, Seven Fingered Jack, and sometimes Mount Fernow in the same trip.

Geology 

The mountain is made of Cretaceous Orthogneiss, and Tonalite. The flank of the mountain on the southwest side are made of Triassic Orthogneiss and Triassic to Permian Heterogeneous Metamorphic rock. While the northeast side also consist of Eocene Quartz Diorite, and small marble deposits. Many normal faults are present as well as one small strike-slip fault near Spectacle Buttes.

Routes 
 
West Gully 
North Face  very steep snow
South slopes

References

Gallery

External links
 
 Mount Maude weather forecast

Mountains of Chelan County, Washington
Mountains of Washington (state)